The Caloocan Loadmanna Knights a professional chess club which plays in the Professional Chess Association of the Philippines (PCAP) based in Caloocan, Metro Manila.

History
The Caloocan Loadmanna Knights owned by Bong Velasco was formed a few days prior to the start of the inaugural draft for the Professional Chess Association of the Philippines (PCAP). Arnel Batungbakal whose last involvement in chess was two decades ago was tasked to form a competitive team. In the first round of the All-Filipino Conference, the Knights dominated the North division finishing with a win-loss record of 11–0. However they lost two South division teams Iloilo and Negros, and Camarines in the second round. The team also lost in the Armageddon play.

References

2020 establishments in the Philippines
Chess clubs in the Philippines
Sports in Metro Manila